The following is a list of notable rugby union competitions that are still currently in existence. This includes both international tournaments played by national Test teams and also domestic club and provincial competitions.

International tournaments 

Four Nations Tournament — Belgium, Spain, Welsh club XV, France amateur
Pan-American Championship — Uruguay, Canada, United States and Argentina
South American Rugby Championship
Super Cup — Canada, Japan, Russia and United States (formerly called the Super Powers Cup)
World Rugby Under 20 Championship — First-tier worldwide competition for under-20 men; replaced Under 19 and Under 21 World Championships starting in 2008
World Rugby Under 20 Trophy — Second-tier worldwide competition for under-20 men
Autumn internationals — A name which refers to a series of Tests which take place usually in November each year in the Northern Hemisphere
Africa Cup — The main tournament for African nations.
CAR Super 16 — A regional tournament for African nations below the Africa Cup.
Viking Tri-nations Rugby A rugby tournament Played by Norway, Denmark, and since 2011 Sweden.

See also:
Rugby union at the Summer Olympics
Rugby union tours
Women's international rugby

Club and provincial tournaments

Intercontinental
United Rugby Championship — provincial/regional teams from Ireland, Italy, Scotland, South Africa and Wales. The competition began as the Celtic League, restricted to the three Celtic nations; became Pro12 when two Italian teams joined in 2010–11 and Pro14 when two South African teams joined in 2017–18. In 2021 the name was changed to United Rugby Championship.
Global Rapid Rugby — currently on hold due to the COVID-19 pandemic, with an uncertain future. It was established in 2019 involving six professional teams from Australia, Asia and the Pacific.

Africa

South Africa
 Currie Cup — South African provincial tournament, also featuring an invitational team from Namibia
 Rugby Challenge — Launched in 2017 as the replacement for the Vodacom Cup, also featuring an invitational team from Namibia
 Varsity Rugby — a two-tier annual South African inter-university competition
 Gold Cup — an annual South African inter-club competition, also featuring invitational teams from Namibia and Zimbabwe

Ghana
 Ghana Rugby Club Championship (GRCC) — The top tier rugby union competition in Ghana since 2014.

Kenya
 Kenya Cup — The top tier rugby union competition in Kenya since 1970.

Americas

SRA

Super Rugby Americas - is a professional rugby union competition and the top-level championship for many countries in South America.

Argentina
Nacional de Clubes - Club competition in Argentina
Torneo de la URBA - Club competition for teams from Buenos Aires and Rosario
Torneo del Interior - Club competition for teams outside Buenos Aires

Brazil
Campeonato Brasileiro de Rugby - Club competition in Brazil

Canada
Major League Rugby
Canadian Rugby Championship - NB: Now defunct, it was the successor to Rugby Canada Super League

United States
Major League Rugby - a professional men’s league representing the highest level of rugby competition in North America. 
USA Rugby Women's Premier League (USARWPL) - Women's club competition in the United States

Uruguay
Club Championship - Club competition in Uruguay

Asia

Hong Kong
 Hong Kong Premiership - Hong Kong club teams

India
All India & South Asia Rugby Tournament - Indian club knockout tournament

Japan
Rugby League One – League for Japanese corporate teams
Top Challenge League – Second-tier league for Japanese corporate teams
All-Japan Rugby Football Championship

Malaysia
MRU Super League - Malaysian club teams
MRU Super Cup - Malaysian club knockout tournament

Sri Lanka
Clifford Cup - Sri Lanka Division 'A' teams (end of season knockout tournament)
Sri Lanka Rugby Championship (Dialog Rugby League) - Sri Lanka Division 'A' club teams

Europe

European Rugby Champions Cup — Replaced the Heineken Cup effective with the 2014–15 season, although it claims the history of the former competition as its own. European club, provincial and regional teams, currently from the countries that participate in the Six Nations.
European Rugby Challenge Cup — Replaced the original European Challenge Cup in 2014–15; also claims the history of its predecessor as its own. Second-tier European club, provincial and regional teams knock-out tournament, also involving all of the Six Nations countries, with possible involvement from lower-tier countries (see below).
European Rugby Continental Shield – Third-tier competition involving teams from Italy's Top12, plus clubs from lower-tier countries; determines two places in each year's Challenge Cup. Originally known as the European Rugby Challenge Cup Qualifying Competition; current name adopted in 2016–17.
Rugby Europe Super Cup - Third tier of European club rugby 2021.
Copa Ibérica de Rugby — Annual competition between Spanish and Portuguese clubs.
Anglo-Welsh Cup — English and Welsh clubs knock-out tournament. From 1971–2005, open to all English clubs with no involvement from any other nation; from the 2005–06 season, has featured the 12 Premiership clubs and the four Welsh regional sides competing in Pro12. 
British and Irish Cup — Tournament launched in 2009 featuring sides from second-level leagues in England and Wales, plus second-tier sides from Ireland and Scotland.
Regional Rugby Championship — Tournament launched in 2007 involving teams from Bosnia & Herzegovina, Croatia, Hungary, Montenegro and Serbia.

England

Men
Gallagher Premiership - English clubs, top tier
RFU Championship - English clubs, second tier
National League 1
National League 2 North
National League 2 South
Northern Division - North 2 East
Midlands 6 East (NW)

Women
Premier 15s – top flight

France
Top 14 — French clubs, top tier
Rugby Pro D2 - French clubs, second tier
Fédérale 1
Fédérale 2
Fédérale 3
Challenge Yves du Manoir
Coupe de l'Espérance
Coupe de France

Ireland
All Ireland League (AIL/AIB League) — Irish clubs from all 32 counties.

Italy
 Top12 — Italian clubs, top tier
 A Series — Italian clubs, second-level championship where winners can jump up to Top12.
 B Series — Italian clubs, third-level league, winners can play on A Series.
 C Series — Italian clubs, the lowest-tier for local teams. Winners are promoted to B Series.

Scotland
 Super 6
 Scottish Premiership
 Scottish National League Division One
 Scottish National League Division Two
 Scottish National League Division Three
 Caledonia Regional League
 East Regional League
 West Regional League
 Border League
 Scottish Cup

Wales
 Welsh Premier Division
 WRU Division One East
 WRU Division One West
 WRU Division Two East
 WRU Division Two West
 WRU Division Three East
 WRU Division Three South East
 WRU Division Three South West
 WRU Division Three West
 WRU Division Four East
 WRU Division Four South East
 WRU Division Four South West
 WRU Division Four West
 WRU Division Five East
 WRU Division Five South Central
 WRU Division Five South East
 WRU Division Five South West
 WRU Division Five West
 WRU Division Six East
 WRU Division Six South East
 WRU Division Six Central
 WRU Division Six West
 WRU Division One North 
 WRU Division Two North

Austria
1. Rugby Bundesliga

Belgium
Belgian Elite League

Czech Republic
Extraliga

Denmark
DRU Superliga

Finland
Finnish Championship League

Georgia
Didi 10

Germany
Rugby-Bundesliga

Malta
Malta Rugby Union National Championship

Netherlands
Ereklasse

Norway
Norway Rugby Championship

Poland
Ekstraliga

Portugal
 Campeonato Português de Rugby — Portuguese clubs
 Campeonato Nacional de Rugby I Divisão
 Campeonato Nacional de Rugby II Divisão 
 Taça de Portugal
 Supertaça de Portugal

Romania
SuperLiga

Russia
Professional Rugby League - Russian club competition

Spain
División de Honor

Sweden
Allsvenskan

Ukraine
Superliga

Oceania
Super Rugby — teams from Australia, New Zealand, and the Pacific (known originally as Super 12 and later as Super 14; the name "Super Rugby" was officially adopted from 2011. It is now known as 'Super Rugby Pacific' for the upcoming 2022 season).
Pacific Rugby Cup - Franchise teams from Fiji, Tonga & Samoa

Australia
Shute Shield - Sydney and regional NSW club teams
Tooheys New Cup - Sydney club teams
New South Wales Suburban Rugby Union - lower level suburban rugby in Sydney, the largest centrally administered rugby competition in the world.
Queensland Premier Rugby - Queensland club competition

Fiji
Colonial Cup — Fiji club competition
Sukuna Bowl — Fiji Police vs Fiji Military
Digicel Cup — Fiji's Local competition between 12 Districts

New Zealand
Mitre 10 Cup — New Zealand professional provincial tournament
Heartland Championship — New Zealand amateur provincial tournament
Ranfurly Shield — New Zealand provincial challenge trophy

Sevens tournaments

Rugby World Cup Sevens — Sponsored by World Rugby, and held every four years, this was the highest prize in the Sevens version of the game before the introduction of sevens to the Olympics in 2016. It was initially planned for the 2013 edition to be the last, but it was later decided to retain the World Cup Sevens and establish a new four-year cycle starting in 2018.
World Rugby Sevens Series — Annual WR-sponsored series of tournaments for men's national Sevens teams. As of the upcoming 2017–18 series, the events in the series are (in order of play):
Dubai Sevens
South Africa Sevens
Australian Sevens
New Zealand Sevens
USA Sevens
Canada Sevens
Hong Kong Sevens, traditionally the biggest annual event in Sevens
Singapore Sevens
France Sevens
London Sevens
World Rugby Women's Sevens Series — Annual WR-sponsored series of tournaments for women's national Sevens teams. As of the most recent 2016–17 series, the events are (in order of play):
Dubai Women's Sevens
Australian Women's Sevens
USA Women's Sevens
Japan Women's Sevens
Canada Women's Sevens
France Women's Sevens
The National Schools Sevens - held at Rosslyn Park, in England, the biggest sevens competition in the world. News, photos and up to the minute results can be found on the official website . Results can also be seen on The Schools' Rugby Website
Commonwealth Games — Quadrennial; most recent tournament in 2014. Men only through 2014; first women's event to be held in 2018.
 Other:
 Amsterdam Sevens
 Bangkok Sevens
 Benidorm Sevens
 Bogota Sevens
 Caldy Sevens
 Cape Fear Sevens
 Caribbean Sevens
 Cayman Sevens
 Cwmtawe Sevens
 Heidelberg Sevens
 Henley Sevens
 Kinsale Sevens
 Kiama Sevens
 Lisbon Sevens
 Melrose Sevens
 Middlesex Sevens
 Neuchatel Sevens
 New York Sevens
 Northern Sevens
 Punta del Este Sevens
 Rome Sevens
 Safari Sevens
 Scandinavian Sevens
 Singapore Sevens
 Sofia Sevens
 Santa Teresa Sevens
 Sri Lanka Sevens

Other tournaments
Sanix World Rugby Youth Tournament held annually in Japan 
English Colts Club Knockout Cup — Held annually
Ulster Schools Cup  — Annual schools competition
Munster Schools Senior Cup  — Annual schools competition
Craven Week — Annual South Africa schools competition
Bingham Cup — Held every two years, this is the largest international gay rugby tournament and honours 9/11 hero, Mark Bingham
Rugby union at the Maccabiah Games: representative XVs from various countries have been taking part in the Maccabiah Games since 1981.
Mad River/Stowe 15's Tournament. Started in 1972 held now in Stowe,VT typically the last weekend in June at the Polo Grounds.

International trophies
The trophies in this list are regularly contested between two nations. Some of the competitions for these trophies form part of other international tournaments, such as the Six Nations and The Rugby Championship.

Six Nations Trophies
Six Nations Championship Trophy, since 2015
Triple Crown Trophy, since 2006 
Calcutta Cup — England and Scotland, since 1879
Centenary Quaich - Ireland and Scotland, since 1989
Millennium Trophy — England and Ireland, since 1988
Giuseppe Garibaldi Trophy — France and Italy, since 2007
Auld Alliance Trophy - Scotland and France, since 2018

Trophies in The Rugby Championship
Bledisloe Cup — Australia and New Zealand, since 1931
Mandela Challenge Plate — Australia and South Africa, since 2000
Freedom Cup — New Zealand and South Africa, since 2004
Puma Trophy — Argentina and Australia

Other Trophies
Anexartisias Cup (Independence Cup) — Cyprus and Greece
Antim Cup — Georgia and Romania
Dave Gallaher Trophy — France and New Zealand
Ella-Mobbs Trophy — Australia and England
Elgon Cup — Kenya and Uganda
Hillary Shield — England and New Zealand
Hopetoun Cup — Australia and Scotland
James Bevan Trophy — Australia and Wales
Lansdowne Cup — Australia and Ireland
Prince William Cup — South Africa and Wales
Trophée des Bicentenaires — Australia and France
Tom Richards Trophy— Australia and the British and Irish Lions
Raeburn Shield— Hypothetical World Title Shield
Utrecht Shield— Hypothetical Women's World Title Shield

Notes and references

 
Competitions
Rugby union